The Leyden High School District 212, named after Leiden, operates two high schools (9-12) in Cook County, Illinois, USA. The boundaries of the district include River Grove, Franklin Park, Melrose Park, Leyden Township, Schiller Park, Northlake, and Rosemont. The schools have 215 teachers (FTEs) serving 3,339 students.

History 
In 1913, the first Leyden was originally a two-year high school which is now present day Hester Junior High School in Franklin Park. It became a four-year high school in 1924 where it was known as Cook County District 212. With increase in population, the East Leyden building was expanded and finished by 1955. West Leyden was built and finished by 1959. In 1965, West Leyden housed Triton Junior College until its buildings were constructed in River Grove by 1969. By 2009, East Leyden purchased 12 acres for parking lot and field expansion.

Organization and Staff 
It is governed by a 9-member school board. The president of the board is Mr. Gregory T. Ignoffo. Dr. Nick Polyak serves as the current superintendent over the district since 2013.

Athletics 
Each sport is offered to all students at both schools, but some are practiced at only one location.

Bowling
Boys Baseball
Boys Basketball
Boys Cross Country
Boys Football
Golf
Boys Soccer
Swimming
Boys Tennis
Boys Track & Field
Boys Volleyball
Boys Wrestling

Badminton
Girls Basketball
Cheerleading
Girls Cross Country
Girls Gymnastics
Leydenettes
Girls Soccer
Softball
Girls Tennis
Girls Track & Field
Girls Volleyball

Note: Based on 2017 school year data

External links
Leyden High School District 212 Website

References 

School districts in Cook County, Illinois
Northlake, Illinois
Franklin Park, Illinois
School districts established in 1913
1913 establishments in Illinois